Nainsook is a soft, fine, lightweight form of muslin. Muslin encompasses a broad range of fabrics of varying weight and fineness, but is always a plain weave, cotton fabric. The word 'nainsook' is first documented in 1790, and derives from the Hindi word nainsukh, which literally means "eye's delight".

Nainsook was often used to make babies' clothing or lingerie at least until the 1920s. Nainsook cotton was also often used to make bias tape in the 1950s and 1960s.

See also
Lawn cloth

References

Woven fabrics